Aetobatus is a genus of eagle rays native to the Atlantic, Pacific and Indian Oceans. It was formerly placed in Myliobatidae, but is now placed in its own family Aetobatidae based on salient differences from myliobatids, especially the pectoral fins joining the head at the level of the eyes.

Species
There are currently either 3 or 5 recognized extant species in this genus depending on the status of A. narinari:

There are also 6 extinct species (only known from fossil remains) placed in this genus:
†Aetobatus arcuatus 
†Aetobatus cappettai 
†Aetobatus irregularis 
†Aetobatus punctatus 
†Aetobatus poeyi 
†Aetobatus sinhaleyus

See also
 List of prehistoric cartilaginous fish genera

References 

Family AETOBATIDAE

 
Ray genera
Taxa named by Henri Marie Ducrotay de Blainville
Taxonomy articles created by Polbot